The 3rd district of the Iowa Senate, located in Northwestern Iowa, is currently composed of parts of Plymouth County and Woodbury County. Its current member of the Iowa Senate is Republican Jim Carlin.

Current elected officials
Republican Jim Carlin has been the senator representing the 3rd District since 2017.

The area of the 3rd District contains two Iowa House of Representatives districts:
The 5th District (represented by Thomas Jeneary)
The 6th District (represented by Jacob Bossman)

The district is also located in Iowa's 4th congressional district, which is represented by U.S. Representative Randy Feenstra.

Past senators
The district has previously been represented by:

Abner H. McCrary, 1856–1857
Gideon S. Bailey, 1858–1859
Cyrus Bussey, 1860–1861
James Pollard, 1862–1863
Samuel A. Moore, 1864–1867
Henry C. Traverse, 1868–1871
Horatio A. Wonn, 1872–1877
Joshua Miller, 1878–1879
Jesse J. Wall, 1880–1883
Edward J. Gault, 1884–1887
William H. Taylor, 1888–1891
Ephraim M. Reynolds, 1892–1895
Beryl F. Carroll, 1896–1899
Claude R. Porter, 1900–1903
Lewis L. Taylor, 1904–1912
James M. Wilson, 1913–1920
John J. Ethell, 1921–1924
Lloyd Ellis, 1925–1928
Herbert B. Carroll, 1929–1932
John K. Valentine, 1933–1936
Hugh Guernsey, 1937–1940
Dewey Goode, 1941–1944
James R. Barkley, 1945–1948
David Sherman West, 1949–1952
Ted D. Clark, 1953–1956
Gene Lyle Hoffman, 1957–1960
Joe N. Wilson, 1961–1964
Donald S. McGill, 1965–1970
Wayne D. Keith, 1971–1972
Warren E. Curtis, 1973–1978
Arne Waldstein, 1979–1982
Douglas Ritsema, 1983–1986
Wilmer Rensink, 1987–1998
Kenneth Veenstra, 1999–2002
David Johnson, 2003–2012
Bill Anderson, 2013–2017
Jim Carlin, 2017–present

See also
Iowa General Assembly
Iowa Senate

References

03